Italy–Lebanon relations are relations between Italy and Lebanon. Both countries are members of the Union for the Mediterranean.

History
In 64 B.C., the Roman general Pompey added Lebanon to the Roman Republic. During and before this time, Phoenicians and Romans exchanged knowledge, habits, and customs.

Lebanon opened a legation in 1946, which was transformed into an embassy in 1955. Both countries signed a Treaty of Friendship, Cooperation and Navigation in 1949. The Italian Cultural Institute of Beirut is located on the ground floor of the Embassy in the suburb of Baabda.

Official visits
In April 2014, Italian Defense Minister Roberta Pinotti visited Lebanese President Michel Sleiman and Prime Minister Tammam Salam to discuss international support for the Lebanese Armed Forces.

Economic relations 
In 2019, the volume of trade between Italy and Lebanon amounted to $1.35 billion, with Italy exporting $1.31 billion worth of goods to Lebanon and Lebanon exporting $39.8 million worth of goods to Italy.

Italy's main export to Lebanon is refined oil (41.5%), with jewellery (5.01%) and eyewear (1.98%) also among the most-exported products from Italy. Lebanon's main export to Italy are scrap copper (24.8%) and phosphoric acid (24.5%), with other notable exports being gold (6.76%) and scrap aluminium (5.85%).

Italian aid to Lebanon 
The Italian Government supported the reconstruction of Lebanon after the Taef Agreement.

In December 2013, the Italian Government announced increased funding to Lebanon to assist Lebanon in dealing with refugees fleeing the Syrian Civil War. Italy also announced a rescue mission with five to seven ships to rescue thousands of migrants, mostly Syrians, in the Mediterranean Sea.

See also 
 Foreign relations of Italy
 Foreign relations of Lebanon
 Italians in Lebanon

Bibliography
 Giampaolo Conte, Economic Relationship between Italy and Lebanon in the Fifties in "Oriente Moderno" V. 94, Issue 1, pp 99 – 112

References

External links
 Lebanese Embassy in Italy 

 
Lebanon
Bilateral relations of Lebanon